Clorinde was a 44-gun  of the French Navy. The Royal Navy captured her in 1803 and took her into service as HMS Clorinde. She was sold in 1817.

French naval service

She was laid down as Havraise in 1796, and was renamed to Clorinde before her commissioning in Nantes. In 1801, she was under Emmanuel Halgan.

In February 1802, under frigate captain Pierre-Marie Le Bozec, she was sent on station at Santo Domingo. The Royal Navy took her into service under her existing name.

Royal Navy service
The Royal Navy commissioned Clorinde at Jamaica in May 1804 under Captain Robert O'Brien. She arrived at Plymouth on 23 July.

Between November 1807 and December 1808 Clorinde underwent repairs. In October, Captain Thomas Briggs recommissioned her. He sailed her to the East Indies on 17 February 1809.

On 28 January 1810 Clorinde captured the French privateer Henri.  Henri was pierced for 14 guns, but mounted only eight 12-pounder guns. She had a crew of 57 men.

In November 1810, Clorinde was part of the squadron participating in the invasion of Isle de France.

In September 1814 Clorinde was under the command of Captain Samuel Pechell.

Fate
The Principal Officers and Commissioners of His Majesty's Navy offered "Clorinde, of 38 guns and 1161 tons", lying at Deptford, for sale on 30 January 1817. The Royal Navy sold Clorinde on 6 March 1817 to Mr. Freake for £2,500.

Citations

References
 Roche, Jean-Michel (2005) Dictionnaire des Bâtiments de la Flotte de Guerre Française de Colbert à nos Jours. (Group Retozel-Maury Millau).
 
 Winfield, Rif & Stephen S Roberts (2015) French Warships in the Age of Sail 1786 - 1861: Design Construction, Careers and Fates. (Seaforth Publishing).

External links
 

Uranie-class frigates
Age of Sail frigates of France
1800 ships
Captured ships
Frigates of the Royal Navy